Novomaiorske is a village in Volnovakha Raion (district) in Donetsk Oblast of eastern Ukraine, at about  southwest by west of the centre of Donetsk city. It belongs to Staromlynivka rural hromada, one of the hromadas of Ukraine.

The village came under attack by Russian forces in 2022, during the Russian invasion of Ukraine, and was regained by Ukrainian forces by the beginning of August the same year.

References

Villages in Volnovakha Raion